The Permanent Representative of Peru to the Organization of American States is the Permanent Representative of Peru to the Organization of American States.

Peru is a founding member of the OAS and has sent permanent representatives since the organization's inception in 1948.

List of representatives

See also
List of ambassadors of Peru to the European Union
Permanent Representative of Peru to the United Nations
Permanent Delegate of Peru to UNESCO

References

Organization of American States